Say Something or Say Somethin' may refer to:

Music

Albums
 Say Something (album), by Via Audio, 2007
 Say Something or the title song, by Andy Leek, 1988
 Say Something, by Ellis Paul, 1993

Songs
 "Say Somethin" (Austin Mahone song), 2012
 "Say Something" (A Great Big World song), 2013
 "Say Something" (Karen Harding song), 2015
 "Say Something" (Kylie Minogue song), 2020
 "Say Something" (Justin Timberlake song), 2018
 "Say Somethin (Mariah Carey song), 2006
 "Say Something" (Timbaland song), 2009
 "Say Something" (Tiësto song), 2020
 "Say Something", by Dr. Dog from Easy Beat, 2005
 "Say Something", by Drake from So Far Gone, 2009
 "Say Something", by Eskimo Joe, 2020
 "Say Something", by Flying Lotus from Flamagra, 2019
 "Say Something", by Fra Lippo Lippi, 1984
 "Say Somethin, by Gloria Gaynor from I Have a Right, 1979
 "Say Something", by Haven, 2002
 "Say Something", by James from Laid, 1993
 "Say Something", by Keith Urban from The Speed of Now Part 1, 2020
 "Say Something", by Lapush from Someplace Closer to Here, 2005
 "Say Something", by Talib Kweli from Eardrum, 2007
 "Say Something", by Twice from Eyes Wide Open, 2020

Other uses
 "Say Something" (Gilmore Girls), a television episode
 Say Something, a 1968 children's book by Mary Stolz

See also 
 Say Anything (disambiguation)